Phaenopsis is a subgenus of flies in the family Tachinidae.

Species
P. arabella Townsend, 1912
P. venusta (Reinhard, 1946)

References

Exoristinae
Diptera of North America
Insect subgenera